Early childhood trauma refers to various types of adversity and traumatic events experienced during the early years of a person's life. This is deemed the most critical developmental period in human life by psychologists. A critical period refers to a sensitive time during the early years of childhood in which children may be more vulnerable to be affected by environmental stimulation. These traumatic events can include serious sickness, natural disasters, family violence, sudden separation from a family member, being the victim of abuse, or suffering the loss of a loved one. Traumatic experiences in early childhood can result in severe consequences throughout adulthood, for instance developing post-traumatic stress disorder, depression, or anxiety. Negative childhood experiences can have a tremendous impact on future violence victimization and perpetration, and lifelong health and opportunity. However, not all children who are exposed to negative stimuli in early childhood will be affected severely in later life; some children come out unscathed after being faced with traumatic events, which is known as resilience. Many factors can account for the invulnerability displayed by certain children in response to adverse social conditions: gender, vulnerability, social support systems, and innate character traits. Much of the research in this area has referred to the Adverse Childhood Experiences Study (ACE) study. The ACE study found several protective factors against developing mental health disorders, including mother-child relations, parental health, and community support.  However, having adverse childhood experiences creates long-lasting impacts on psychosocial functioning, such as a heightened awareness of environmental threats, feelings of loneliness, and cognitive deficits. Individuals with ACEs are more prone to developing severe symptoms than individuals in the same diagnostic category.

Emotional Functioning 
Research shows that even witnessing traumatic events can impact the physical development of a child’s brain — potentially leading to lifelong impairments in emotional functioning. In particular, they could diminish the structure and functioning of brain systems. Some children may forget the traumatic event all together, thought it can re-surface years later with severe symptoms or not surface at all. Moreover, youth that grow up in emotionally dysfunctional environments typically don't have the opportunity to appropriately feel and express emotions, which can cause further distress accompanied by severe symptoms that persist into adulthood. This can further cause a person difficulty in creating or maintaining relationships, or further frustration and anxiety. Similarly, internalizing problems such as anxiety, depression, withdrawal, and somatic complaints are related to other forms of emotional dysregulation that can lead to difficulty with attention and cognitive control. Additionally, whether children experienced neglectful behavior or abuse, they tend to show poor understanding of emotions, especially those whom were subject to high levels of anger or hostility by their caregivers. 

Researchers have also presented findings on the development of facial recognition of emotion in physically abused and neglected toddlers. Their results outline that physically abused children have difficulty recognizing sadness and disgust, while neglected children have more difficulty discriminating differences between emotional expressions. However, both physically abused and neglected children tend to rate expressions of anger and sadness similarly to emotionally neutral expressions. Additionally, they describe how an appropriate level of exposure to emotional expressiveness supports good learning of emotion in children but increased exposure to anger and hostility or poor communication can lead to less than ideal learning of emotions.  

Moreover, results from recent neurological research suggests that childhood psychological trauma can influence the same physiological response systems as physical trauma can. Neurologically, the initiation of emotion occurs as a product of the interaction between bottom-up and top-down processes.  Emotional regulation involves numerous brain regions and involves a broadly dispersed functional network with bidirectional links among many emotion-relevant regions in the brain. For example, research has identified the amygdala, ventral striatum, thalamus, hypothalamus, and periaqueductal gray as key areas of activation during administration of emotional tasks. 

In a typically developing child, maturation of neural and neuroendocrine systems is related to decreased emotional lability and increased self-control. However, these processes also depend on the maturation of parasympathetic regulation in early childhood and developments in the hypothalamic-pituitary-adrenocortical (HPA) axis, which are shaped by positive early experiences and caregiver receptiveness. Therefore, home environments that do not foster healthy maturation in brain systems may interfere with the development of language as a means to comprehend and communicate emotions effectively, and other cognitive processes regulated by the attentional system.

Depression 
Depression can be displayed in persons that have experienced acute or chronic trauma, especially in their childhood. With the surfacing of relevant studies, evidence proposes that childhood trauma is a large risk factor in developing depressive disorders that can persist into adulthood. Also, these findings present that clinically depressed individuals reported being exposed to adversity/trauma during their early years of childhood. Types of adversity that were listed by clinically depressed individuals involved sexual, physical, and emotional abuse, neglect, separation from a parent, or mental illness in a parent. Specifically, the strongest correlation between the types of adversity and adulthood depression is sexual abuse and neglect, particularly in females. Therefore, it is crucial in realizing how large of a factor environment surrounding a child plays in the development of depression.

As mentioned before, the Adverse Childhood Experiences Study is one of the largest studies that aspires to explore the relationship between childhood maltreatment and long term health outcomes. This study presented  "findings showing that two-thirds of the participants reported at least one child adversity while one out of 5 participants reported having more than 3 child adversities, which was followed by a range of long term health consequences such as depression and major psychiatric disorders".

Post- Traumatic Stress Disorder (PTSD) 
Post-traumatic stress disorder is differentiated from other psychiatric disorders by its need for a triggering stressor. A few of the more common sources that can provoke PTSD are community violence (war), natural disasters, or serious illnesses. The depth and severity of the trauma exposed to children were relative to high levels of psychopathology, especially anxiety and depressive disorders, as well as further impairments. Also, new information was obtained in light of evidence, which suggests that a caretaker being sent to prison had the same effect of depth of PTSD on children as rape did. Additionally, a sudden separation from a loved one for any reason or receiving traumatic news about a loved one can also provoke severe PTSD in children. Furthermore, specific reports from a research study indicated that adults who were diagnosed with PTSD had a history of exposure to countless trauma as children, had a history of anxiety, and were known to come from adverse social conditions. For this disorder, the prevalence rate is higher in girls than boys.   Yet, reports of previous research showed that the risk of developing PTSD after being exposed to trauma in childhood was less than those who were exposed during adulthood.

Resilience 
Psychological resilience often refers to an individual's ability to utilize past experiences with stressors to successfully navigate new life challenges, and it is portrayed as the power to bounce back. Children who endured certain trauma in early life may develop the capacity to anticipate potential conflict or trauma before it occurs, and can plan to react accordingly, minimizing their stress as much as possible. After being subject to traumatic experiences countless children can become resilient and even display more strength than before,  known as invulnerability. Reason being, there are factors to consider when contemplating on how certain children become resilient when faced with adverse social conditions. These factors include innate childhood qualities, specific character traits, social support systems, capability to make the best of what they're given, and ultimately the will to survive. 

Research on children’s emotional experience and competence suggests that children who have emotionally charged experiences tend to have a heightened awareness of emotional cues; thus, allowing for more effective processing of information. Despite this evidence, some studies have showed that adults who were believed to be resilient after facing trauma in their childhood, also reported high levels of anxiety and depression; those deemed resilient can fall apart at any time if a certain vulnerability is triggered. Some people are more apt to cope with stressful events than others. Not every child who has experienced early trauma will display psychological resilience, as each brain is wired differently; where some children may find future scenarios easier to navigate as a result, others may fall back on maladaptive coping mechanisms that make future stressors significantly more difficult. For example, someone who tended to dissociate during conflict as a child to protect themselves may find themselves relying on the same strategy during a mundane argument with their spouse ten years down the road -- this detachment will not work the same way, and it will not allow them to resolve the conflict at hand. This ingrained behavior is disruptive but can be amended by finding alternative ways to cope with tense situations. 

If the early childhood trauma stems from a parent or guardian, or an individual the child has to encounter daily, the child may develop resilience through repeated exposure to mistreatment. This gives them a better picture of which strategies work, and which ones do not. This dynamic can complicate the lingering effects of the trauma; research shows that abused children need a secure, stable adult in their life to lean on for assistance. Children with healthy parent-child relationships can go to their guardian for advice on how to navigate or overcome a negative experience, but when the parent or guardian is the source, the child may feel stranded. On the other hand, if they have an adult figure that validates their emotions and provides comfort, they will have an easier time building a support network, contributing to the development of their psychological resilience.

Psychogenic Amnesia 
In cases of severe childhood trauma, it is not uncommon for individuals to experience amnesia later on in life; for example, some victims of childhood sexual abuse do not remember the events in question until decades later. In psychogenic amnesia, also known as dissociative amnesia, the brain actively suppresses unpleasant memories in order to protect the mental wellbeing of the individual, and only later uncovers them when the individual is in a state of mind or environment that allows them to safely process such unpleasantries. Adults who experienced early childhood trauma may not realize the extent of their experiences until much later in life. Future recall muddles the individual's perception of his or her own credibility and makes it difficult to discern whether this sudden surfacing of a memory is real or not, causing them to delay seeking help or support.

References 

Child and adolescent psychiatry
Trauma types
Adverse childhood experiences